Income equality may refer to:

 Economic egalitarianism, a state of economic affairs in which equality of outcome has been manufactured for all participants
 Economic inequality, differences in the distribution of wealth and income within or between populations or individuals
 Distribution of wealth, comparison of the wealth of various members or groups in a society

See also
 List of countries by income equality